Shululux  is a village in Buuhoodle District, in the Togdheer Region of Somaliland. It is located north by road from Widhwidh.

See also

References

External links
Geographic Names

Populated places in Togdheer